Peter Pan Goes Wrong is a play by Henry Lewis, Jonathan Sayer, and Henry Shields of the Mischief Theatre Company, creators of The Play That Goes Wrong (2012). The premise, as in The Play That Goes Wrong, is that the actors and crews are members of the fictitious Cornley Polytechnic Drama Society are presenting a production; in this case, of the 1904 J. M. Barrie play Peter and Wendy, and ruin it through amateurism and personal rivalries.

Production history

London 
The play made its premiere at the Pleasance Theatre in London in December 2013 before touring the UK in 2014. The production transferred to the West End in London at the Apollo Theatre for a Christmas season run in 2015, running from 4 December 2015 to 26 February 2016. It featured the original cast of The Play That Goes Wrong reprising their cast and crew characters from the original production, with the addition of Ellie Morris as Robert's niece Lucy, who is subjected to increasingly serious injuries over the course of the show. It returned to the Apollo Theatre the following year for another Christmas season run from 21 October 2016 to 29 January 2017, making it the third show running in the West End from the Mischief Theatre Company after The Play That Goes Wrong and The Comedy About A Bank Robbery. Great Ormond Street Hospital Children's Charity benefited from royalties of the play, in accordance to the terms of the Copyright, Designs and Patents Act 1988 which granted them a right to royalty in perpetuity from adaptations of the story of Peter Pan on stage, publication and film in the UK.

UK Tour 
It was announced in April 2019 that the show would embark on a UK Tour starting in October 2019 at The Everyman Theatre in Cheltenham before visiting Cardiff, Cambridge, Brighton, Salford and stopping in London at the Alexandra Palace for a Christmas run from 13 December 2019 till 5 January 2020.

Broadway 
It was announced on 5 January 2023 that the show would transfer to Broadway at the Ethel Barrymore Theatre for a limited sixteen-and-a-half weeks beginning 17 March 2023, with an opening night set for 19 April 2023.

Reception 
Like The Play That Goes Wrong, Peter Pan Goes Wrong received positive reviews. WhatsOnStage.com gave it five out of five stars.

The original West End run was nominated for the 2016 Laurence Olivier Award for Best New Comedy but lost to Nell Gwynn.

Television special 
The play was adapted into a one-hour television special which was broadcast on 31 December 2016 on BBC One, guest-starring David Suchet as the narrator, and featuring the original cast, with the exception of Rob Falconer. It was filmed in front of a live audience at dock10 studios and featured additional footage of other BBC television sets being accidentally invaded.

See also 
 The Play That Goes Wrong
 The Comedy about a Bank Robbery
 Noises Off

References

External links 
 

West End plays
2013 plays
Sequel plays
Plays based on other plays
Works based on Peter Pan
Mischief Theatre